Meica is a German food company based in Edewecht. It was founded in 1908.

Meica produces a range of sausages. The company exports products to about 50 countries and offers private-label production services.

As of 2020, the company does not use the  welfare label to indicate how the animals used in its products are treated.

External links 
 Company website

References 
Meat companies of Germany
Food and drink companies established in 1908
1908 establishments in Germany